Victor Andrew Zwolak (born November 30, 1938) is an American middle-distance runner. He competed in the men's 3000 metres steeplechase at the 1964 Summer Olympics. He was inducted into the Delaware Sports Museum and Hall of Fame in 1976.

References

External links
 

1938 births
Living people
Athletes (track and field) at the 1964 Summer Olympics
American male middle-distance runners
American male steeplechase runners
Olympic track and field athletes of the United States
Sportspeople from Wilmington, Delaware